Trickdisc Recordings is a Drum'n'Bass record label from Austria. It was founded as the first Austrian Drum'n'Bass label at the end of 1998 by Thomas Kienast, also known as DJ Tomkin. From Trickdisc's initial idea to be a stage for upcoming Austrian artists it developed to an internationally known label. Among Trickdisc's releases the names of popular international Drum'n'Bass artists like Ill Skillz, Chris. Su und Counterstrike can be found.

Discography

See also
 List of record labels

External links 
 
 Discogs

Austrian record labels
Record labels established in 1998
Electronic music record labels